Dead Letter Office is a 1998 Australian film starring Miranda Otto.

Plot
"After years of having her letters to her estranged father come back as undeliverable, a young woman takes a job at a Dead Letter Office. She hopes to figure out how to locate her father. Unexpectedly, she finds a potential romance and begins to learn more about herself."

Cast
 Miranda Otto as Alice Walsh
 Alicia Banit as Young Alice
 Tess Mornana as Young Alice (voice)
 Georgina Naidu as Mary

Production
It was shot in May and June 1997.

References

External links

Review at Urban Cinefile
Dead Letter Office at Oz Movies

Australian romantic comedy-drama films
PolyGram Filmed Entertainment films
Films scored by Roger Mason (musician)
Films about postal systems
1990s English-language films
1990s Australian films